Wath North railway station was on the Midland Railway's Sheffield - Cudworth - Normanton - Leeds  main line, serving the town of Wath-upon-Dearne, South Yorkshire, England.  The town had three railway stations, of which Wath North was the furthest from the town centre; it was three-quarters of a mile to the north, in an area of heavy industry away from residential areas, on the road to Bolton-on-Dearne.

It was built by the North Midland Railway in 1841, the year after the railway opened, and was called Wath and Bolton. It was a victim of the Beeching axe, closing on 1 January 1968 when the local Sheffield-Cudworth-Leeds passenger trains were withdrawn. Express passenger and freight trains continued to pass through the station until 1986 when the line was closed due to severe subsidence; few remains of the station were present at that time.

References

Wath upon Dearne
Disused railway stations in Rotherham
Former Midland Railway stations
Railway stations in Great Britain opened in 1841
Railway stations in Great Britain closed in 1968
Beeching closures in England